Strumigenys trada is a species of ant that was discovered and described by Lin, C. C. & Wu, W. J. in 1996.

This species is only known from Taiwan. It is similar to Strumigenys godeffroyi but is smaller and shinier, with smaller eyes.

References

Myrmicinae
Insects described in 1996
Endemic fauna of Taiwan
Insects of Taiwan
Hymenoptera of Asia